Chipman Airport may refer to:

 Chipman Airport (Alberta), in Alberta, Canada
 Chipman Airport (New Brunswick) in New Brunswick, Canada